Lyubomyr Polatayko (born 21 November 1979) is a Ukrainian professional racing cyclist.

Career highlights

2002
1st Scratch race, Round 3 2002 UCI Track Cycling World Cup Classics, Moscow
3rd Pursuit, Round 5 2002 UCI Track Cycling World Cup Classics, Kunming

2003
2nd 2003 European Track Championships, Omnium, Elite

2005
3rd Team Pursuit, Round 2 2004–2005 Track World Cup, Los Angeles

2006
2nd Team Pursuit, Round 4 2005–2006 Track World Cup, Sydney
2nd Madison, UCI Track Cycling World Championships
3rd Team Pursuit, UCI Track Cycling World Championships
3rd Team Pursuit, Round 1 2006–2007 Track World Cup, Sydney

2007
1st Team Pursuit, Round 3 2006–2007 Track World Cup, Los Angeles
2nd Team Pursuit, UCI Track Cycling World Championships
3rd Madison, Round 2 2007–2008 Track World Cup, Beijing

2008
3rd Team Pursuit, Round 3 2007–2008 Track World Cup, Los Angeles
3rd Team Pursuit, Round 2 2008–2009 Track World Cup, Melbourne

External links
 

1979 births
Living people
Ukrainian male cyclists
Olympic cyclists of Ukraine
Cyclists at the 2008 Summer Olympics
Place of birth missing (living people)
UCI Track Cycling World Champions (men)
Ukrainian track cyclists

.   https://ru.m.wikipedia.org/wiki/%D0%9F%D0%BE%D0%BB%D0%B0%D1%82%D0%B0%D0%B9%D0%BA%D0%BE,_%D0%9B%D1%8E%D0%B1%D0%BE%D0%BC%D0%B8%D1%80_%D0%9D%D0%B8%D0%BA%D0%BE%D0%BB%D0%B0%D0%B5%D0%B2%D0%B8%D1%87